Brande Castiglioni or Branda Castiglioni (1415–1487) was a Roman Catholic prelate who served as Bishop of Como (1415–1487).

Biography
Brande Castiglioni was born in Milan, Italy in 1415.
On 8 October 1466, he was appointed during the papacy of Pope Paul II as Bishop of Como. On 19 October 1466, he was consecrated bishop by Guillaume d'Estouteville, Cardinal-Bishop of Ostia e Velletri, with Philippe de Lévis, Archbishop of Arles, and Jean L'Espervier, Bishop of Saint-Malo, serving as co-consecrators.
He served as Bishop of Como until his death on 16 July 1487.

References

External links and additional sources
 (for Chronology of Bishops) 
 (for Chronology of Bishops) 

15th-century Italian Roman Catholic bishops
Bishops appointed by Pope Paul II
1415 births
1487 deaths